The Unicode character  (U+2019 ) is used both for a typographic apostrophe and a single right (closing) quotation mark. This is due to the many fonts and character sets (such as CP1252) that unified the characters into a single code point, and the difficulty of software distinguishing which character is intended by a user's typing. There are arguments that the typographic apostrophe should be a different code point, U+02BC .

The straight apostrophe  (the "ASCII apostrophe") is even more ambiguous, as it could also be intended as a left or right quotation mark, or a prime symbol.

See also 
 General Punctuation (Unicode block)

References

Punctuation